Sunlight Makes Me Paranoid is the debut full-length album by American rock band Elefant. Originally released on April 8, 2003 by Kemado Records, it was re-released in October 2004 on Hollywood Records following the success of the single "Misfit".

Track listing
 "Make Up" (3:21)
 "Now That I Miss Her" (2:37)
 "Misfit" (3:14)
 "Bokkie" (3:36)
 "Tonight Let's Dance" (3:07)
 "Static on Channel 4" (2:18)
 "Sunlight Makes Me Paranoid" (4:19)
 "Annie" (3:15)
 "Love" (4:01)
 "Ester" (2:49)

References

Elefant (band) albums
2003 debut albums
Hollywood Records albums